Century Club may refer to:

The Century Club of San Diego, California
Century Club of Scranton, Pennsylvania
Travelers' Century Club, a club for travelers who have visited 100 or more countries of the world
DX Century Club, an amateur radio operating award for contacting 100 geographic entities
VHF/UHF Century Club, an amateur radio operating award for contacting 100 stations in other Maidenhead grid locators
FIFA Century Club; see
List of men's footballers with 100 or more international caps
List of women's footballers with 100 or more international caps

See also
New Century Club (disambiguation)
The Nineteenth Century Club, Memphis, Tennessee
Twentieth Century Club (disambiguation)
The Century Association, New York City